Sergei Sergeyevich Yakovlev (4 August 1925 – 1 January 1996) was a Soviet and Russian actor. He appeared in more than forty films from 1957 to 1992.

Selected filmography

References

External links 

1925 births
1996 deaths
20th-century Russian male actors
People from Kurgan, Kurgan Oblast
Honored Artists of the RSFSR
People's Artists of the RSFSR
Recipients of the Medal "For Courage" (Russia)
Russian male film actors
Russian male stage actors
Russian male voice actors
Soviet male film actors
Soviet male stage actors
Soviet male voice actors
Burials at Vagankovo Cemetery